Jayabâhu I was the brother of Vijayabâhu I. He ruled for just one year, from 1110 to 1111. He was defeated in war by Vikramabâhu I.

See also
 Mahavamsa
 List of monarchs of Sri Lanka
 History of Sri Lanka

References

External links
 Kings & Rulers of Sri Lanka
 Codrington's Short History of Ceylon

Monarchs of Polonnaruwa
J
J
J
Buddhist monarchs
 Sinhalese Buddhist monarchs